Giampaolo Sgura (born 1974) is an Italian fashion photographer.

He works with magazines, including international editions such as Vogue (France, Japan, Germany, Spain, Brazil, Mexico, Australia and Italia), Teen Vogue, Allure, Hercules, GQ Style (Great Britain and Germany), GQ (Spain and China) and Interview (Germany).

Early life 
Sgura is from Apulia, Italy. He completed his study in architecture in Milan. He begin his career in photography, after producing a reportage for Glamour. He was mentored by Richard Avedon and Irving Penn.

Career 
He has photographed for campaigns for Dolce & Gabbana, Roberto Cavalli, La Perla, Moschino, Versace and Ermenegildo Zegna. Giampaolo contributes to Vogue Japan, Vogue Deutsch, Vogue Korea, Vogue China, Vogue Paris, GQ, Allura, GQ Style, Italian Glamour, Hercules and Teen Vogue. Some of his fashion clients include MaxMara,  Pierre Balmain, Romeo Gigli, Massimo Dutti, Emporio Armani, Gucci, Blumarine, Reebok, Twinset, Neiman Marcus, Saks and Revlon.

References

External links 
Official website
 Fashion photography with Giampaolo Sgura on Phase One
  Giampaolo Sgura on WorldCat
 Rockin’ Urban Fashion in Vogue Japan

1975 births
Living people
Photographers from Milan